The 2019 Guangzhou International Women's Open was a professional women's tennis tournament played on outdoor hard courts. It was the 16th edition of the Guangzhou International Women's Open, and part of the WTA International tournaments of the 2019 WTA Tour. It took place at the Guangzhou Tianhe Sports Center in Guangzhou, China, from September 16 through September 21, 2019.

Points and prize money

Prize money

1 Qualifiers prize money is also the Round of 32 prize money
* per team

Singles main-draw entrants

Seeds

 1 Rankings are as of September 9, 2019

Other entrants
The following players received wildcards into the singles main draw:
  Duan Yingying
  Svetlana Kuznetsova
  Peng Shuai
  Samantha Stosur

The following player received entry into the singles main draw as a special exempt:
  Nina Stojanović

The following players received entry from the qualifying draw:
  Magdalena Fręch
  Tereza Martincová
  Jasmine Paolini
  Lesley Pattinama Kerkhove
  Xun Fangying
  Katarina Zavatska

The following players received entry into the main draw as lucky losers:
  Dalila Jakupović
  Wang Xiyu

Withdrawals
Before the tournament
  Jennifer Brady → replaced by  Aleksandra Krunić
  Sorana Cîrstea → replaced by  Sara Sorribes Tormo
  Svetlana Kuznetsova → replaced by  Wang Xiyu
  Rebecca Peterson → replaced by  Dalila Jakupović

Retirements
  Elena Rybakina (left thigh injury)
  Sara Sorribes Tormo (right foot injury)
  Elina Svitolina (right knee pain)

Doubles main-draw entrants

Seeds

 1 Rankings are as of September 9, 2019

Other entrants
The following pairs received wildcards into the doubles main draw:
  Lu Jiajing /  Xun Fangying
  Ng Kwan-yau  /  Zheng Saisai
The following pair received entry as alternates:
  Lesley Pattinama Kerkhove /  Ankita Raina

Withdrawals
Before the tournament
  Elena Rybakina (left thigh injury)

Champions

Singles

  Sofia Kenin def.  Samantha Stosur, 6–7(4–7), 6–4, 6–2

Doubles

  Peng Shuai /  Laura Siegemund def.  Alexa Guarachi /  Giuliana Olmos, 6–2, 6–1

References

External links
 Official website

Guangzhou International Women's Open
Guangzhou International Women's Open
Guangzhou International Women's Open
Guangzhou International Women's Open